is a prefecture of Japan located in the Kansai region of Honshu. Hyōgo Prefecture borders Kyoto Prefecture to the east, Osaka Prefecture to the southeast, and Okayama Prefecture and Tottori Prefecture to the west.

Kōbe is the capital and largest city of Hyōgo Prefecture, and the seventh-largest city in Japan, with other major cities including Himeji, Nishinomiya, and Amagasaki. Hyōgo Prefecture's mainland stretches from the Sea of Japan to the Seto Inland Sea, where Awaji Island and a small archipelago of islands belonging to the prefecture are located. Hyōgo Prefecture is a major economic center, transportation hub, and tourist destination in western Japan, with 20% of the prefecture's land area designated as Natural Parks. Hyōgo Prefecture forms part of the Keihanshin metropolitan area, the second-most-populated urban region in Japan after the Greater Tokyo area and one of the world's most productive regions by GDP.

History 

Present-day Hyōgo Prefecture includes the former provinces of Harima, Tajima, Awaji, and parts of Tanba and Settsu.

In 1180, near the end of the Heian period, Emperor Antoku, Taira no Kiyomori, and the Imperial court moved briefly to Fukuhara, in what is now the city of Kobe. There the capital remained for five months.

Himeji Castle, a UNESCO World Heritage Site, is in the city of Himeji.

Southern Hyōgo Prefecture was severely devastated by the 6.9 Mw Great Hanshin earthquake of 1995, which destroyed major parts of Kobe and Awaji, as well as Takarazuka and neighboring Osaka Prefecture, killing nearly 6,500 people.

Geography 

Hyōgo has coastlines on two seas: to the north, the Sea of Japan, to the south, the Seto Inland Sea. On Awaji Island, Hyōgo borders the Pacific Ocean coastline in the Kii Channel. The northern portion is sparsely populated, except for the city of Toyooka, and the central highlands are only populated by tiny villages. Most of Hyōgo's population lives on the southern coast, which is part of the Osaka-Kobe-Kyoto metropolitan area. Awaji is an island that separates the Inland Sea and Osaka Bay, lying between Honshu and Shikoku.

Summertime weather throughout Hyōgo is hot and humid. As for winter conditions in Hyōgo, the north of Hyōgo tends to receive abundant snow, whilst the south receives only the occasional flurry.

Hyōgo borders on Osaka Prefecture, Kyoto Prefecture, Tottori Prefecture and Okayama Prefecture.

 20% of the total land area of the prefecture was designated as Natural Parks, namely the Sanin Kaigan and Setonaikai National Parks; Hyōnosen-Ushiroyama-Nagisan Quasi-National Park; and Asago Gunzan, Harima Chūbu Kyūryō, Inagawa Keikoku, Izushi-Itoi, Kasagatayama-Sengamine, Kiyomizu-Tōjōko-Tachikui, Onzui-Chikusa, Seiban Kyūryō, Seppiko-Mineyama, Tajima Sangaku, and Taki Renzan Prefectural Natural Parks.

Current municipalities

Islands 
Awaji Island
Ieshima Islands

Two major artificial islands are located Hyōgo Prefecture:
Rokkō Island
Port Island

National parks
Sanin Kaigan National Park
Setonaikai National Park
Hyōnosen-Ushiroyama-Nagisan Quasi-National Park

Mergers

Future mergers
The city of Akō and the only town in Akō District (Kamigōri), were scheduled to merge and the city would still retain the name Akō. Akō District would be defunct if the merger was successful. However, the merger hasn't taken place.

Economy 

As in all prefectures nationwide, agriculture, forestry, and fisheries play a big role in the economy of Hyogo Prefecture.
Hyōgo Prefecture also has an IT industry, many heavy industries, metal and medical, Kobe Port being one of the largest ports in Japan. Kobe Port also hosts one of the world's fastest supercomputers, and Hyogo Prefecture passed laws to keep Kobe Port free of nuclear weapons (a nuclear-free zone) since the year 1975.

Hyōgo is a part of the Hanshin Industrial Region. There are two research institutes of Riken, natural sciences research institute in Japan, in Kobe and Harima. "SPring-8", a synchrotron radiation facility, is in Harima.

Culture

National Treasures of Japan 
Himeji Castle in Himeji (UNESCO World Heritage Site)
Jōdo-ji in Ono
Ichijō-ji in Kasai
Kakurin-ji in Kakogawa
Taisan-ji in Kobe
Chōkō-ji in Katō
Chorakuji in Kami, Hyōgo (Mikata)

Important Preservation Districts for Groups of Historic Buildings in Japan 
Kitano-chō Yamamoto-dōri
Izushi
Sasayama

Museums 
Hyōgo Prefectural Museum of Art in Nada Ward, Kobe.
Kobe City Museum in Chuo Ward, Kobe.
Kobe Maritime Museum in Chuo Ward, Kobe.
KOSETSU Museum of Art in Higashinada Ward, Kobe.
Hakutsuru Fine Art Museum in Higashinada Ward, Kobe.
Himeji City Museum of Art in Himeji.
Asago Art Village in Asago.
Ashiya City Museum of Art & History in Ashiya.
TEKISUI MUSEUM OF ART in Ashiya.
Osamu Tezuka Manga Museum in Takarazuka.

Education

Universities

Amagasaki 
Sonoda Women's University
St. Thomas University (ex-Eichi University) – closed in 2015

Takarazuka 
Takarazuka University
Koshien University

Sanda 
Kwansei Gakuin University (Sanda Campus)

Nishinomiya 
Kobe College
Kwansei Gakuin University
Otemae University
Mukogawa Women's University

Ashiya 
Ashiya University

Kobe 
Kobe University
Kobe University of Commerce
Kobe Gakuin University
Kobe City University of Foreign Studies
Kobe Women's University
Kobe Shukugawa Gakuin University
Kobe Institute of Computing
Konan University
University of Marketing and Distribution Sciences
University of Hyogo

Kato 
Hyogo University of Teacher Education

Akashi 
University of Hyogo

Kakogawa 
Hyogo University

Himeji 
Himeji Institute of Technology
Himeji Dokkyo University
Himeji Kinki University
University of Hyogo

Akō 
University of Hyogo

High schools
There are 163 public and 52 private high schools within Hyogo prefecture. Of the public high schools, some are administered by the Hyogo prefectural government, whilst the others are administered by local municipalities.

Ashiya International Secondary School, founded 2003

Sports 

The sports teams listed below are based in Hyōgo.

Football (soccer)
 Vissel Kobe  (Kobe)
 INAC Kobe Leonessa (Women's) (Kobe)

Baseball
 Orix Buffaloes  (Kobe)
 Hanshin Tigers  (Nishinomiya)

Volleyball
 Hisamitsu Springs  (Kobe)
 JT Marvelous  (Nishinomiya)

Rugby
 Kobelco Steelers  (Kobe)
 World Fighting Bull  (Kobe)

Basketball
 Nishinomiya Storks (Nishinomiya)

Tourism 
A popular troupe of Takarazuka Revue plays in Takarazuka.

Arima Onsen in the south of the province in Kita-ku, Kobe is one of the Three Ancient Springs in Japan. The north of Hyogo Prefecture has sightseeing spots such as Kinosaki Onsen, Izushi, and Yumura Onsen. Takeda Castle in Asago is often referred to locally as the "Machu Picchu of Japan". The matsuba crab and Tajima beef are both national delicacies.

Festivals and events

Miyuki Street New Year's midnight traditional sale, Himeji
Nishinomiya Shrine's Ebisu Festival in January
Yanagihara Ebisu Festival in January, Kobe
Tada Shrine's Genji Festival in April, Kawanishi
Kobe Festival and Parade in May
Aioi Peron Festival in May
Himeji Yukata Festival in June
Dekansho Bon Dancing Festival in August, Sasayama
Nada Fighting Festival, Himeji
Kobe Luminarie in December
Ako Chushingura Parade

Transportation

Rail
JR West
San'yō Shinkansen
JR Kobe Line
Wadamisaki Line
San'yō Main Line
San'in Line
Fukuchiyama Line (JR Takarazuka Line)
Kakogawa Line
Bantan Line
Kishin Line
Akō Line
Hankyu Railway
Kobe Line
Kobe Kosoku Line
Itami Line
Imazu Line
Koyo Line
Takarazuka Line
Nose Railway
Myoken Line
Nissei Line
Shintetsu
Arima Line
Kobe Kosoku Line
Sanda Line
Kōen-Toshi Line
Ao Line
Kobe Municipal Subway
Seishin-Yamate Line
Kaigan Line
Hokushin Line
Hojo Railway (Ao-Hojo)
Hanshin Railway
Main Line
Kobe Kosoku Line
Mukogawa Line
Hanshin Nanba Line
Sanyo Railway
Main Line
Aboshi Line
Chizu Express
Kitakinki Tango Railway
Miyazu Line

People movers
Kobe New Transit
Port Liner
Rokkō Liner

Road

Expressways
Chūgoku Expressway
San'yō Expressway
Kobe-Awaji-Naruto Expressway
Meishin Expressway
Maizuru-Wakasa Expressway
Bantan Expressway
Second Shinmei road
Hanshin Expressway

National highways

Route 2
Route 9
Route 28
Route 29
Route 43
Route 171
Route 173
Route 174 (Sannomiya-Kobe Port)
Route 175
Route 176
Route 178
Route 179
Route 250
Route 312
Route 372
Route 373
Route 426
Route 427
Route 428
Route 429
Route 436
Route 477
Route 482
Route 483

Ports
 Kobe Port – Mainly international container hub port
 Akashi Port
 Shikama Port – Mainly Shōdo Island route ferry

Airport
Kobe Airport
Konotori Tajima Airport

Notable people

Ume Aoki, manga artist
Mana Ashida, child actress from Nishinomiya
Koichi Domoto, singer of KinKi Kids
Heath, musician, singer-songwriter and bassist of X Japan is from Amagasaki
Hiro Fujiwara, manga artist
Miracle Hikaru, comedian and impersonator is from Toyooka
Kanō Jigorō, founder of the martial art Judo
Jun, musician, singer-songwriter and guitarist of Phantasmagoria is from Kobe
Shinji Kagawa, footballer from Kobe
Tomoya Kanki, drummer of One Ok Rock
Takumi Kawanishi (J-pop idol singer and dancer, member of JO1)
Tomomi Ogawa, bassist of Scandal
Itzuki Yamazaki, professional wrestler from Ieshima
Kaoru, guitarist of Dir En Grey
Ayaka Kimura, actress, former singer of Coconuts Musume is from Kobe
Keiko Kitagawa, actress from Pretty Guardian Sailor Moon and Buzzer Beat was born in Kobe
Miho Komatsu, singer and songwriter from Kobe
Yūji Kuroiwa, politician from Kobe, current governor of Kanagawa Prefecture
Kamui Kobayashi, former Sauber and Toyota Racing driver from Amagasaki
Chisa Maekawa, singer of Girl Next Door
Kiyomatsu Matsubara, ichthyologist, herpetologist and marine biologist
Hitoshi Matsumoto, comedian, from Amagasaki
Aya Matsuura, singer is from Himeji
Ryuto Kazuhara, vocalist of Generations from Exile Tribe is from Amagasaki
Mina Myoui – American-born Japanese singer of South Korean group Twice. Raised in Nishinomiya
Hiro Matsushita – Businessman, former driver in Champ Car series. Chairman of Swift Engineering & Swift Xi
Miyavi, musician, although born in Konohana-ku, Osaka grew up in Kawanishi
Minako Nishiyama, contemporary artist
Masamune Shirow, manga artist was born in Kobe
So Taguchi, outfielder for the Chicago Cubs
Masahiro Tanaka, pitcher for the New York Yankees
Nagaru Tanigawa, creator of the Haruhi Suzumiya series was born in Kinki
Tsuneko Taniuchi, contemporary performance artist
Fumito Ueda, video game creator of Ico, Shadow of the Colossus, and The Last Guardian
Juri Ueno, Japanese Academy Award-winning actress best known for her performances in Swing Girls and the live-action adaptation of Nodame Cantabile, is from Kakogawa
Shota Yasuda, guitarist of Kanjani Eight is from Amagasaki
Piko, musician, Vocaloid singer born in Kobe, Hyōgo

Sister regions

Hyogo entered a sister state relationship with Washington state in the United States on October 22, 1963, the first such arrangement between Japan and the United States.

In 1981, a sister state agreement was drawn up between Hyogo and the state of Western Australia in Australia. To commemorate the 10th anniversary of this agreement in 1992, the Hyogo Prefectural Government Cultural Centre was established in Perth.

See also 
 Banshu Yamasaki Iris Garden
 Fastest Computer in the world

Notes

Citations

General references 
 Nussbaum, Louis-Frédéric and Käthe Roth (2005). Japan Encyclopedia. Cambridge, Mass.: Harvard University Press. . .

External links 

 Official Hyōgo prefecture homepage
 Hyōgo prefecture tourist guide
 Hyōgo Business & Cultural Center
 Medical Services in Hyōgo prefecture

 
Kansai region
Prefectures of Japan